Ragnar Olof Jakob Stenberg (14 June 1887 – 6 December 1954) was a Finnish sprinter and a sports leader.

Athletics

Olympic Games 

He was injured during the Finnish Olympic trials of 1908, but was selected based on his performance the previous year.

National 

He is credited with two Finnish record times in 400 metres:
 9 September 1906, he tied the current record with 52.4 seconds
 31 August 1908, his time 53.0 is noted as a national record

In the Finnish Championships in Athletics, he won a five golds:
 400 metres: 1907
 110 metre hurdles: 1907 and 1909
 combined running championship: 1907 and 1909

Other 

He was a board member of the Finnish Olympic Committee in 1919–1920 and 1923–1926, and a member of the International Association of Athletics Federations Council in 1921–1926. He also was a manager of Clas Thunberg.

Personal 

His parents were father Jakob Esaias Stenberg and mother Anna Maria Brofeldt. His brother R. E. Stenberg was also a sprinter, who broke the Finnish record for 4 × 100 metres relay in 1917.

He graduated as a licentiate of dentistry in 1914. His practice was in Helsinki.

References

External links
 

1887 births
1954 deaths
Athletes from Helsinki
Athletes (track and field) at the 1908 Summer Olympics
Olympic athletes of Finland
Finnish male sprinters